Lokman Mohsen Slim (17 July 1962 – 4 February 2021) was a Lebanese Shiite publisher, political activist and commentator, who promoted a Culture of Remembrance to cope with the many past and present conflicts of Lebanon and the whole region. Slim was known to be a prominent critic of Hezbollah but also critical of all other sectarian parties. He was found shot to death in his car in Hezbollah-dominated southern Lebanon. Many people, including Slim's sister have alleged Hezbollah to have committed the assassination, a charge that Hezbollah has denied.

Early life and career
Lokman Mohsen Slim was born in Haret Hreik, what was then a village near and is now Southern Beirut. He was the scion of an influential Lebanese-Shia family  with strong ties to the Christian elites. His mother Salma Merchak, who survived him, is a Christian from Egypt. His father Mohsen Slim was a deputy (MP) in the Lebanese parliament from 1960 to 1964 and in 1977 founded the Shia-dominated party of the Union des Forces Libanaises, which demanded the disarmament of the militant Palestinian forces in Lebanon. Later in the course of the Lebanese Civil War he moved his law practice to Paris.

Lokman Slim moved to France in 1982 to study philosophy at the Paris-Sorbonne University. He returned to Beirut in 1988. Two years later, he founded Dar al Jadeed Publishing House, which publishes Arabic literature and essays of controversial content. Its publications range from books banned by the Lebanese General Security to the first Arabic translations of the writings of Muhammad Khatami, the former Iranian reformist president, which generated controversy within the Shia community in Lebanon. Several of Slim's articles, essays, and translations have been published in English, French, and Arabic newspapers and books. He lived and worked in the Southern Suburbs of Beirut, Greater Beirut, South Lebanon, and the Bekaa Valley.

Art as political activism 

In 2001, Slim moved into film with the establishment of Umam Productions, which has produced several films, including Massaker co-directed by Slim and his German wife Monika Borgmann. It won the Fipresci Award at the Berlin International Film Festival in 2005. In 2004, he co-founded Umam Documentation & Research (D&R), a non-profit organization based in the southern Beirut suburb of Haret Hreik, where the organization is creating an open archive of materials concerning Lebanon's social and political history. The organization organizes and facilitates exhibits at its famous “Hangar” for artists to openly address the scars of the Lebanese Civil War (1975–1990), which is considered taboo and taught neither at the elementary or high school levels. Umam also organizes film screenings, art exhibitions, and discussions relating to civil violence and war memory.

One of Umam's ongoing exhibits since 2008 is “Missing,” a collage of photographs depicting persons missing from the Lebanese Civil War. The exhibition is presented in conjunction with Committee of the Relatives of the Kidnapped and Missing in Lebanon, Support of the Lebanese in Detention and Exile, and the Committee of the Families of Lebanese Detainees in Syria along with hundreds of individuals related to the missing.

Civic education as driver for political change 

Slim's project Hayya Bina (HB), meaning "Let’s Go", is an initiative which began during the 2005 parliamentary elections in Lebanon with the aim of promoting citizen involvement in the political process and opposing Lebanon's sectarian system. Slim himself compared the religiously based sectarian communities to “cells in which the Lebanese are jailed." Hayya Bina implements projects nationwide, working particularly in the Shiite communities of South Lebanon, the “Dahieh” of Beirut, Mount Lebanon, and the Bekaa Valley regions.

In 2008, Hayya Bina participated as a partner with the National Democratic Institute's (NDI) “Citizen Lebanon” project. In conjunction with leadership and civic participation trainings conducted by NDI, Hayya Bina spearheaded a number of public advocacy projects in Shiite areas of Lebanon. In Baalbek, Hayya Bina's field staff organized a pesticide project in order to help boost the economy of local farmers; in Shmustar, staff coordinated with residents to publicly advocate for garbage collection services to prevent communicable diseases from spreading; in Hermel, a region-wide project to clean up the Assi River. This project included environmental awareness activities, cleanup days, and formal discussions with elected officials.

Hayya Bina continues to implement Lebanon's only nationwide English education program for adult women, “Teach Women English,” recruiting teachers in rural areas in order to bring classes to economically depressed areas in the south and Bekaa Valley. The program's pedagogy combines formal grammar with substantive nodes, such as human rights, civics, workplace, and around-the-home vocabulary. The program's cross-regional emphasis has also enabled rural teachers who have never left their villages to travel across the country for teacher training programs.

Slim stated in 2019 that Hezbollah's leader was responsible for alleged incidents where people came to his home and offices to chant slurs and threats. He also reported death threats after a debate during the 2019–2020 Lebanese protests. Slim has stated a belief that Hezbollah had a role in the 2020 Beirut explosion.

Death
On the night of 3 February 2021, during the lockdown, Lokman was returning alone in his rented car to Beirut, after visiting a friend in the village of Niha, Tyre District, and was not traceable in the next hours. Later his car was discovered in a remote area between the villages of Addousiyeh and Tafahta in southern al Zahrani district, Sidon District, and Lokman was found dead inside it, after being shot four times in the head and once in the back. He was admitted to a local hospital, where he was declared dead. His sister said that "probably there's an ideological and political background in the assassination".

Slim had, in the days before the killing, stated that Hezbollah supporters had been threatening him at his home and accusing him of treason. After the death was confirmed, Jawad Nasrallah, the son of Hezbollah's leader, tweeted: "The loss of some people is in fact an unplanned gain #notsorry". He later deleted the message and denied that he had been referring to Slim. Hezbollah condemned the killing, denied any involvement and called for an immediate investigation. DW judged that Slim was "one in a long list of killings" befalling Hezbollah's critics, and that "no one in Lebanon expects any resolution to Slim's murder".

References

External links

 Hayya Bina
 UMAM Documentation and Research

1962 births
2021 deaths
Paris-Sorbonne University alumni
Lebanese activists
Businesspeople from Beirut
Assassinated Lebanese newspaper publishers (people)
Lebanese Shia Muslims
Deaths by firearm in Lebanon
Lebanese people of Egyptian descent